CFAV Glendale (YTB 641) is a Glen class naval tugboat operated by the Royal Canadian Navy. Built at Yarrow Shipyard, Esquimalt, British Columbia and launched in 1975, the ship was delivered on 16 September 1975. Attached to Maritime Forces Pacific, the ship is based at CFB Esquimalt.

References

Fleet of the Royal Canadian Navy
1975 ships
Glen-class tugs (1975)
Auxiliary ships of the Royal Canadian Navy